Dead Men Tell No Tales may refer to:

Books and literature
Dead Men Tell No Tales, an 1898 novel by E. W. Hornung
Dead Men Tell No Tales, a 2005 comic book series published by Arcana Studio

Film
Dead Men Tell No Tales, 1914 short film directed by F. Martin Thornton
Dead Men Tell No Tales (1920 film), a 1920 film directed by Tom Terriss, based on the Hornung novel
Dead Men Tell No Tales (1938 film), a 1938 British thriller film
Pirates of the Caribbean: Dead Men Tell No Tales, a 2017 film

TV
Dead Men Tell No Tales, a 1971 TV film by Walter Grauman
"Dead Men Tell No Tales", a 1990 episode of Zorro
"Dead Men Tell Tales", a 2003 episode of The Dead Zone
"Dead Men Tell No Tales", 2015 episode of Sleepy Hollow

Miscellaneous
A quote from the Disney attraction "Pirates of the Caribbean"

Music
"Dead Men Tell No Tales", a 1979 song by Motörhead from Bomber
"Dead Men Tell No Tales", a 2006 song by Set Your Goals from Mutiny!
"Dead Men Tell No Tales", a 2015 song by Ten from Isla De Muerta

See also
Dead Men Do Tell Tales (disambiguation)